State Route 78 (SR 78) is a state highway that runs for 105 miles (169 km) from Nelsonville to Clarington in the U.S. state of Ohio.  Car and Driver has called it one of the most scenic highways nationwide. The stretch of this highway that runs along the south side of Burr Oak State Park in Morgan County, Ohio, is well known for its extreme curves and views, and is sometimes locally referred to as the "Rim of the World."  Much of this highway runs through old coal-producing areas.

SR 78 is an Ohio Scenic Byway and is considered as part of the Appalachian Byway.

Major intersections

References

078
078
078
078
078
078
Scenic byways in Ohio